Oday Talib   (born 1 July 1981 in Iraq) is an Iraqi goalkeeper. He currently plays for Naft Al-Basra.

Career
Talib began his career with Al-Shorta in 2002 before earning a move the following season to Baghdad-based team Al-Zawraa. After spending three years there, Talib went on to play for Al-Minaa before being signed by his current club, Duhok, an Iraqi-Kurdish outfit based in Dohuk.

Talib served as back-up to goalkeeper Noor Sabri throughout Iraq's run to the semi-finals of the Men's Olympic Football Tournament at Athens 2004.

Honours

Country 
 4th place in 2004 Athens Olympics
 2005 West Asian Games Gold medallist.

References

External links
 

1981 births
Living people
Iraq international footballers
Olympic footballers of Iraq
2004 AFC Asian Cup players
Footballers at the 2004 Summer Olympics
2009 FIFA Confederations Cup players
Association football goalkeepers
Iraqi footballers
Al-Zawraa SC players
Al-Mina'a SC players
Duhok SC players
Al-Shorta SC players